Huang Po-jui (born 11 April 1993) is a Taiwanese badminton player. In 2011, he won the gold medal at the Asian Junior Championships in the men's doubles event partnered with Lin Chia-yu. He also won the silver medal at the World Junior Championships.

Achievements

BWF World Junior Championships 
Boys' doubles

Asian Junior Championships 
Boys' doubles

BWF International Challenge/Series 
Men's doubles

  BWF International Challenge tournament
  BWF International Series tournament
  BWF Future Series tournament

References

External links 
 

1993 births
Living people
Taiwanese male badminton players
21st-century Taiwanese people